Hippolyte Hostein (14 September 1814 – 8 September 1879) was a French playwright, theatre director and theatre manager.

Biography 
Boen in Paris, he successively directed the Théâtre Historique (1847-1850), the Théâtre de la Gaité (1849-1858), the Cirque-Olympique (1858-1862), the Théâtre du Châtelet (1862-1864/1865-1869), the Théâtre du Château-d'eau (1868-1869), the Théâtre de la Renaissance (1873-1875) and the Théâtre de l'Ambigu (1875). He also published cronicles in Le Figaro and Le Constitutionnel

Works 
Theatre
Le Miracle des roses, drama in sixteen scenes, with Antony Béraud, 1844
Les Sept Ans de S. A. Mgr le Prince impérial, cantata on a music by Adolphe de Groot, premiered at the Théâtre du Châtelet 16 March 1863
L'Affaire Lerouge, drama in five acts and eight scenes after Émile Gaboriau, premiered at the Théâtre du Château-d'eau 2 May 1872

Texts
1843: Les Contes bleus de ma nourrice, A. Desesserts, Paris
1848: Réforme théâtrale suivie d'Esquisse d'un projet de loi sur les théâtres, A. Desesserts
1867: La Liberté des théâtres, Librairie des auteurs, Paris
1878: Historiettes et souvenirs d'un homme de théâtre, E. Dentu, Paris

Bibliography 
 Philippe Chauveau, Les Théâtres parisiens disparus (1402-1986), Ed. de l'Amandier, Paris, 1999

References

External links 
 Dernière chronique théâtrale d'Hostein, parue dans Le Constitutionnel, le jour même de sa mort.

French theatre managers and producers
19th-century French dramatists and playwrights
Theatre directors from Paris
Writers from Paris
1814 births
1879 deaths